Wilcze Jary  is a village in the administrative district of Gmina Więcbork, within Sępólno County, Kuyavian-Pomeranian Voivodeship, in north-central Poland.

The village has a population of 60.

References

Wilcze Jary